ME5 or ME-5 may refer to:
 Elfin ME5, a sports racing car
 Maine's 5th congressional district
 Maine State Route 5